Air Gegas is a district of South Bangka Regency, Bangka-Belitung Islands. It is the second largest and second most populated district in the regency after the regency seat of Toboali.

The district is subdivided into ten villages, with the administrative centre being at the village of Air Gegas. There are over 1,100 kolong (holes left over by mining activities) in the district due to tin mining, and reclamation activities have been conducted on 49.8 hectares of such land.

References

Populated places in the Bangka Belitung Islands
Districts of South Bangka Regency